Doug Robinson is an American rock climber. He has been called the father of clean climbing in Yosemite. In 1972 he was featured in a National Geographic article about his climb of Half Dome without using pitons, which brought great awareness to the success of clean climbing and catalyze a rapid change attitude in the climbing community against pitons.

References

External links 
"Doug Robinson - Father of clean climbing gives away the dirty secrets". Hour long interview with Robinson about his life and the development of climbing technology.

American rock climbers
Year of birth missing (living people)
Living people